The Spring Valley Shopping Center is an historic shopping center, located at 4820, 4860, 4872, 4874 Massachusetts Avenue and 4301 49th Street, Northwest, Washington, D.C., in the Spring Valley neighborhood.

History
It was designed by A.C. Miller in 1939; the Colonial Revival buildings were originally known as the Spring Valley Shopping Center.

Original tenants included Esso, D.G.S. Market, Garfinckel's Department Store (Spring Valley Branch), and other retailers.

The buildings were added to the National Register of Historic Places on August 7, 2003. Current tenants include Crate & Barrel, Bank of America, Capital One Bank (formerly Chevy Chase Bank), Starbucks Coffee, and Le Pain Quotidien.

In 2015, Washington Real Estate Investment Trust announced development plans.

References

Commercial buildings completed in 1939
Commercial buildings on the National Register of Historic Places in Washington, D.C.
Colonial Revival architecture in Washington, D.C.
Shopping malls established in 1939
Shopping malls in Washington, D.C.
1939 establishments in Washington, D.C.
Department stores on the National Register of Historic Places